The United Episcopal Church of North America (UECNA) is a church in the Anglican tradition and is part of the Continuing Anglican movement. It is not part of the Anglican Communion.

The UECNA describes itself as "embracing the broad base of ceremonial practice inherent in the Historic Anglican Communion" although historically the UECNA has tended to be low or broad church in its ceremonial practice. The UECNA uses the 1928 American Book of Common Prayer and 1662 English prayer book in the US and, in Canada, the 1962 Canadian prayer book and 1662 prayer book.

The changes in the Episcopal Church and the Anglican Church of Canada that the UECNA and other continuing churches objected to include the theology of the newer liturgies such as the Episcopal Church's 1979 prayer book, the ordination of women, attitudes toward divorce and abortion, and differing interpretations of how the authority of scripture is perceived. They also object to more recent innovations such as the ordination of openly homosexual clergy, but these were not at issue when they broke with the Episcopal Church.

History

Founding
The origins of the United Episcopal Church of North America lie with the Congress of St. Louis in September 1977, and with Charles D. D. Doren, the first bishop consecrated for the new "Anglican Church in North America (Episcopal)," later named the Anglican Catholic Church. Doren had been elected bishop of the Diocese of the Midwest immediately following the St. Louis meeting, and was consecrated on 28 January 1978 by Albert A. Chambers, acting bishop of the ACNA(E), and Francisco Pagtakhan. Letters of consent were received from bishops Mark Pae of Taejon, Korea, and Charles Boynton, formerly Assistant Bishop of New York. He was translated to the Diocese of the Mid-Atlantic states in 1979, but he soon backed away from active participation in the Anglican Catholic Church. He was alienated by the numerous constitution and canonical revisions undertaken in 1978-1981 and by the "stained glass ceiling" which kept Low Church clergy out of the episcopate. He finally resigned his diocese at the end of 1980.

Parallel to Doren's departure from active episcopal ministry in the ACC, three parishes sympathetic to Doren's concerns left the Anglican Catholic Church, and set about the task of forming a new body. This led to the creation of the United Episcopal Church of North America at a meeting held in Pittsburgh, Pennsylvania, in October 1981. The standing committee of the new jurisdiction invited Doren to be its first bishop and, subsequently, the first archbishop.

In more recent years, the church has described itself as representing the Broad/Central and Low Church traditions, but it also has one or two parishes from the Anglo-Catholic tradition. The church's constitution and canons are modeled on the PECUSA's 1958 code with some amendments, including provisions for the establishment of dioceses in Canada, and more specific direction is given as to the circumstances in which the jurisdiction will consecrate bishops for overseas.  The last major revision of the UECNA canons was made in 1992/1996 with minor amendments being made in 2011 and 2014, and a more significant revision in 2017.

Under the leadership of archbishops Doren (1981–1987) and Knight (1987–1992), the UECNA grew to almost forty congregations.  In 1988–1990 these were divided between the Diocese of the Ohio Valley and at least three missionary districts - West, South and East. So far this has represented the high-water mark of the church's prosperity.  The UECNA underwent a protracted decline during the early 1990s due to the illness and increasing incapacity of the then presiding bishop, John Cyrus Gramley (South 1985–1996; Presiding Bishop 1992–1996), whose health started to decline shortly after his election.  When the summons to General Convention was issued in 1996 only seven parishes responded.  The Fifth General Convention then proceeded to place the missionary districts into suspension and the church was administered as a single diocese from then until April 2010. Stephen C. Reber Sr. was elected as bishop-coadjutor and consecrated in September 1996 by bishops Robert C. Harvey, assisted by bishops Miller, Hamers, Gramley, and Caudill. Gramley died shortly thereafter.

During the late 1990s, Reber traveled many thousands of miles reactivating old UECNA parishes and receiving new congregations into the jurisdiction.  He continued the policy, started by Knight, of relaxing the aggressively low church stance of the jurisdiction allowing the range of churchmanship within the United Episcopal Church to broaden.  However, unlike the ACC and APCK, the UECNA still requires that, in addition to the Scriptures and the Book of Common Prayer, candidates for the ministry to assent to the Thirty-nine Articles.  In 1999 the UECNA entered into a short-lived intercommunion agreement with the Anglican Province of America, causing the ACC to suspend its intercommunion agreement with the UECNA.  However, that action was not mirrored by the Anglican Province of Christ the King.  The UECNA subsequently suspended its intercommunion agreement with the Anglican Province in America in 2002 when the latter entered into a relationship with the Reformed Episcopal Church.

In 2007, intercommunion with the ACC was restored after a lapse of eight years, so that the UECNA now has cordial relations with both the ACC and the APCK. From 2007 to 2011, the ACC and the UECNA explored opportunities for greater cooperation and the possibility of achieving organic unity. Bishop Presley Hutchens of the ACC addressed delegates to the UECNA convention of 2008 and discussed the possibility of uniting the ACC and UECNA. Although well received at the time, there was a feeling among many of the delegates that the proposal was being rushed, and that no proper consideration was being given to the theological, constitutional and canonical issues thrown up by the move.  Moves towards unity with the Anglican Catholic Church were referred for further discussion and subsequently stalled.

At the 2008 General Convention, the delegates elected three suffragan bishops with the intention that they would serve the UECNA and also assist the ACC and APCK when requested. Two of them subsequently departed the UECNA for the Reformed Episcopal Church, leaving Peter D. Robinson as the sole suffragan bishop in UECNA until his appointment as Bishop of the Missionary District of the West in November, 2009. Robinson was named as Archbishop Coadjutor by the National Council in April 2010 to succeeded Stephen C. Reber upon his retirement on September 6, 2010.  He was elected as Presiding Bishop by the 10th General Convention, held in Heber Springs, AR, on May 12, 2011.  Under Robinson's leadership, the UECNA has returned to a 'Classical Anglican' position emphasizing its continuity with the old Protestant Episcopal Church and the English Reformation.

In July, 2014, a small continuing Anglican jurisdiction, the Diocese of the Great Lakes, under Bishop David Hustwick, joined the UECNA as its diocese for the Great Lakes states and eastern Canada. In January, 2015, a petition was received from Bishop George Conner of the Anglican Episcopal Church at the behest of that jurisdiction's standing committee asking for admission as a non-geographical diocese of the UECNA. This was granted on February 11, 2015.

In mid-2022, there were 25 UECNA congregations in 12 states, including Alabama, Arizona, Arkansas, California, Florida, Kentucky, Michigan, Missouri, New York, North Carolina, and Virginia. The headquarters of the jurisdiction are in Waynesboro, Virginia.

Episcopate

The UECNA traces its historic episcopate from the Church of England as follows:
 John Moore, Archbishop of Canterbury, who, assisted by the Archbishop of York and the Bishop of Bath and Wells, did consecrate on 7 February 1787
 William White, as first Bishop of Pennsylvania, and 1st and 4th Presiding Bishop of the Episcopal Church, who in 1832 consecrated
 John Henry Hopkins, as first Bishop of Vermont and subsequently Presiding Bishop, who in 1867 did consecrate
 Daniel S. Tuttle, as first Missionary Bishop of Montana, who in 1911, as Presiding Bishop did consecrate
 James DeWolf Perry, as seventh Bishop of Rhode Island, who in 1930, as 18th Presiding Bishop did consecrate
 Henry Knox Sherrill, as eighth Bishop of Massachusetts, who in 1950, as 20th Presiding Bishop did consecrate
 Arthur C. Lichtenberger, as ninth Bishop of Missouri, who whilst 21st Presiding Bishop of the Episcopal Church, and assisted by Horace Donegan, Bishop of New York and Reginald Mallet, Bishop of Northern Indiana, consecrated (1962)
 Albert A. Chambers, as Bishop of Springfield, who in 1978, as acting Primate of the Anglican Church of North America (Episcopal), and assisted by Francisco Pagtakhan, and Charles D. D. Doren (later Abp. I of the UECNA) consecrated 
 James Orin Mote, as first Bishop of the Diocese of the Holy Trinity, who assisted by Bishops Burns, Lewis, and Rutherfoord, consecrated (1980)
 Robert Condit Harvey, as first Bishop of the Southwest in the Anglican Catholic Church, who in 1996, assisted by Bishops Ogden Miller, Edwin Caudill, John Hamers, and John Gramley (Presiding Bishop III UECNA), did consecrate,
 Stephen C. Reber Bishop-coadjutor of the UECNA, and subsequently IV Presiding bishop of UECNA, who assisted by William Wiygul, Bishop of the Southeastern States (APCK) and D. Presley Hutchens, Bishop of New Orleans (ACC), on 10 January 2009 consecrated,
 Peter D. Robinson, as a suffragan bishop in the UECNA, who subsequently became II Bishop of the Missionary District of the West, and V Presiding Bishop of the UECNA.

From the Scottish Episcopal Church the line is as follows:
 On November 14, 1784, the bishops Robert Kilgour, Arthur Petrie, and John Skinner (bishop) consecrated
 Samuel Seabury as first Bishop of Connecticut, who in 1792 was one of the consecrators of
 Thomas John Claggett, first Bishop of Maryland, who in 1796 was one of the consecrators for
 Edward Bass, first bishop of Massachusetts, who in 1797 was one of the consecrators of
 Abraham Jarvis, second Bishop of Connecticut, who in 1811 was one of the co-consecrators of
 Alexander Viets Griswold as Bishop of the Eastern Diocese, who in 1836 was one of the co-consecrators of John Henry Hopkins, first Bishop of Vermont, thus uniting in himself the two historical lines of apostolic succession to the episcopate.

Intercommunion agreements
The UECNA has effected intercommunion agreements with a number of other Continuing Anglican churches. Those presently in effect are with:
Anglican Catholic Church,
Anglican Province of Christ the King
 The UECNA had an intercommunion agreement with the Diocese of the Great Lakes prior the Diocese's full incorporation on July 19, 2014.

Governance

Dioceses
The United Episcopal Church is divided into the Diocese of the Great Lakes and two missionary dioceses — the South and Ozarks, consisting of churches in Missouri, Arkansas, Kentucky, Alabama, Arizona, and California; and the East, consisting of churches in Florida, Virginia, and North Carolina.  These are governed on a day-to-day basis by missionary bishops appointed by the National Council who act in concert with the Council of Advice (standing committee) and the Diocesan Convention or Convocation.

Convocations consist of every cleric in good standing and canonically resident within the missionary district, plus lay delegates from each congregation.  District convocations are unicameral, and are responsible for general policy within each district, including the allocation of funds received from the National Council.

General Convention
The General Convention meets every third year and consists of two houses.

The Upper House
The upper house of General Convention is the House of Bishops which consists of all UECNA bishops in good standing. It meets under the chairmanship of the Presiding Bishop and has the power to nominate bishops for missionary dioceses, to take order for the administration of vacant dioceses and missionary districts, and to set policy with regard to ordination and other related matters. Unlike the House of Deputies, it customarily meets annually on the second Thursday of May to discuss matters of mutual concern between meetings of the General Convention.
At present its membership consists of
 Peter D. Robinson, Presiding Bishop of the UECNA and Bishop of the Missionary Diocese of the East.
 David Hustwick, Bishop of the Diocese of the Great Lakes.
 Daniel J. Sparks, Bishop of the Missionary Diocese of the South and Ozarks.
 Paul Slish, Assistant Bishop of the Diocese of the Great Lakes.
 Steven Murrell, Assisting Bishop of the Missionary Diocese of the South and Ozarks.
 John Pafford, Retired Suffragan Bishop of the Diocese of the Great Lakes.
 Jackson Worsham Jr., Bishop Emeritus of the Diocese of the Great Lakes.
 Glen Hartley, Bishop Emeritus of the Missionary Diocese of the South and Ozarks.

The Lower House
The House of Deputies is the lower house of the General Convention. The House of Deputies has a president, who is usually a priest. The present holder of this office is Wayne Ogg, Priest-in-Charge of Grace Anglican Church, Wildwood, Florida. The lower house elects the president, treasurer, and secretary of the General Convention who continue in office until the commencement of the next convention.

Observers
Bishops of the Anglican Catholic Church and the Anglican Province of Christ the King may sit in the UECNA House of Bishops and have voice but not vote.

General Rules of Convention
Business may be originated in either house of General Convention, though the budget customarily commences in the House of Deputies, and canon changes in the House of Bishops. After a first reading it passes to the other house of the General Convention for review and approval. If amendments are made it must be approved and returned to the originating house and be approved as amended before going to the Presiding Bishop for signature.

Consideration is being given to amending the Canons to allow the two Houses of General Convention to meet in joint session, but voting will still be by Houses.

Presiding Bishop
The Presiding Bishop is elected by the General Convention, takes office on the 15th of November following his predecessor's retirement, and serves until the 14th of November following his 72nd birthday, his successor having been elected at the previous General Convention.  In the event of an unexpected vacancy, the senior bishop by date of consecration who has jurisdiction acts as Presiding Bishop until the next General Convention.  The Presiding Bishop is assigned the following duties "to preside over meetings of the House of Bishops...take order for the consecration of bishops, duly elected...and perform such other duties as shall be assigned to him by the General Convention" (UECNA Canon 3).  By custom, he administers vacant dioceses and missionary districts on behalf of the House of Bishops.

The present incumbent is Peter D. Robinson, who was born in 1969 in Scunthorpe and grew up in nearby Barton-upon-Humber, Lincolnshire, England.  Educated at York St. John University, he attended the Anglican Catholic Church's Holyrood Seminary prior to ordination in 1994.  He has served as the UECNA's Presiding Bishop since September, 2010.

National Council
The National Council is composed of the Presiding Bishop, two other bishops, three priests, six laypersons, and two representative of UECW.  The bishops are elected by the House of Bishops, the clergy and lay members are elected members by the House of Deputies, and the two representatives of UECW by their triennial meeting.  The National Council meets regularly each year, usually in mid-May, and at the end of General Convention when it meets.  The Presiding Bishop has the authority to convene special meetings should circumstances so require.  The canons describe the functions of the National Council as being to coordinate the church's social work, missions, and publicity, but over time it has become a sounding board for the House of Bishops assisting them in their administration of the church between general conventions.  Bishop Peter D. Robinson has suggested that it may be time to redefine the role of the National Council, and rename it the "Administrative or Executive Council" and formalize its expanded purpose.

Doctrine
The doctrinal position of the United Episcopal Church is defined by the Preface to the Constitution of the UECNA and the Declaration of Conformity contained in Article VIII of the UECNA Constitution. This centers the Church's doctrine firmly in the 'Classical Anglicanism' tradition as contained in the historic formularies of the Church: the Thirty-nine Articles and the Book of Common Prayer.  These, in turn, refer back to the inerrant Holy Scriptures and the Ancient Fathers and Councils of the Church, as well as to the "New Learning" of the Reformation era.  The UECNA is wary of nineteenth and early twentieth century movements, such as Fundamentalism and Dispensationalism, which are at odds with historic Christian theology.

The UECNA considers the Affirmation of St. Louis to be one of its founding documents but considers it to be a supplement to, rather than a replacement for, older statements such as the Articles of Religion, the Homilies, and the Book of Common Prayer.  The UECNA accepts the Affirmation of St. Louis as a response to the theological and moral crisis in The Episcopal Church and the Anglican Church of Canada in the early 1970s, and as a call to action on the part of orthodox Episcopalians to preserve the traditional teaching and worship of the Church.

In ceremonial matters, the present Presiding Bishop, Peter D. Robinson, points outs that the UECNA has a greater diversity of churchmanship and ceremonial practice than it did in the 1980s.  However, the church is very insistent that ceremonial use conform to traditional Anglican or Episcopalian customs.  Historically, the minimum of vestments required for services in parish churches is surplice and tippet (rochet, chimere and tippet for bishops.)  At the other extreme, the 1559 Ornaments Rubric represents the maximum of vesture and ornament contemplated by the compilers of the Book of Common Prayer.

Ordination and lay leadership

The UECNA's leadership is divided among lay leaders and ordained ministers as follows:

Lay ministry
Lay reader - a layman licensed by the bishop of the diocese to read Morning and Evening Prayer, the Litany, and the Penitential Office, as well as the Burial Office.  He is expected to have a good knowledge of Holy Scripture, and some knowledge of theology, so as to be able to answer questions from lay members of the church, and lead Bible studies.
Diocesan reader - a layman who has already served as a lay reader, has completed a formal course of theology and is licensed to preach sermons of his own composition.
Deaconess - the canons of the UECNA make provision for deaconesses to be "set aside" but not ordained.  The order is open to women over the age of 25 who meet the same criteria as men entering the diaconate.  Their training is similar to that of deacons, but with less emphasis on liturgy, and a particular focus on pastoral and educational work.

Clerical state
 Postulants are students for holy orders but not yet ordained. However, under canon law, they are regarded as having entered the clerical state, and may not be vestrymen or churchwardens.  They are usually expected to serve as lay readers and diocesan readers whilst in training.  A postulant must complete not less than one year of study consisting of Church history, pastoral work, liturgics, doctrine and holy scripture before being admitted as a candidate for holy orders. He assists the local parish as a layreader in the offices of the church as called upon and allowed by the canons of the church.
 Candidates for holy orders are those students who are sufficiently advanced in their studies that their ordination to the diaconate is expected within the next year.  They are expected to function as diocesan readers during the period of their candidacy, preaching under supervision, and assisting the clergy in the conduct of divine worship.
Deacons—a deacon may be either permanent or transitional, though the UECNA makes no formal distinction between the two.  Permanent deacons are those deacons who have decided not to study for the presbyterate, and therefore remain as deacons.  Transitional deacons are training for priesthood.  Before ordination to the priesthood, a deacon should serve for not less than one year and complete a course of study.
Priests—priests or presbyters are ministers of word and sacrament who are authorized to undertake all ministerial functions except ordination and confirmation.  In the UECNA only priests and bishops are allowed to be parish ministers.
Bishops—bishops are "assigned a diocese consisting of a given number of parishes, and will provide regular oversight, counsel and guidance to those parishes. An Episcopal visit to each parish will be made not less than once in three years and attendance at national councils and meetings as called."

Lay leadership positions
In addition to Lay Readers and Diocesan Readers, the following lay ministries exist in the United Episcopal Church.

 Vestryman—every parish has an elected council consisting of between five and thirteen members of the laity.  Vestrymen are expected to be communicant members of the church, over the age of 18.  Their function is to maintain and administer the physical plant of the local parish, and to advise the rector concerning mission, and parish affairs.  Although the traditional term 'vestryman' is used the position is open to both men and women.
 Senior (Rector's) and Junior (Peoples') Wardens take leadership in the vestry and are responsible for relations between the Rector (Minister) and congregation in the case of the Senior Warden, and the maintenance of the parish buildings and plant in the case of the Junior Warden.
 Each parish is free to create such lay ministries as it may require provided that it has the approval of the bishop for so doing.  These ministries may include District Visitors who are appointed by the Rector and Vestry to oversee communicant members of the church; Sunday school teachers and superintendents who undertake to train the children of the parish in Holy Scripture and the teachings of the Church.

United Episcopal Church Women
The UECW is an official organization of women who serve the church.  Their particular focus is to raise funds for the missionary work of the Church.  The work of UECW is coordinated by an Executive Council which is elected at the UECW Triennial Meeting which occurs during the General Convention week.

Publications
Glad Tidings – the Quarterly Magazine and Journal of the UECNA

References

External links
 

1981 establishments in the United States
Anglican denominations in North America
Continuing Anglican denominations
Christian organizations established in 1981